Ostrov Bolshevik is an airfield on Bolshevik Island in Krasnoyarsk Krai, Russia. It is the fourth most northernmost airfield in Russia. It was probably constructed around 1960, and is among several very large trans-polar airfields for Russia's strategic bomber force that were either abandoned during construction or served limited use.

Ostrov Bolshevik was created as one of several winter staging bases for the Soviet Union's Tupolev Tu-95 bomber fleet.  At this type of facility, each fall Army engineering teams would grade the airfield and repair runway markings.  During the winter the airfield would receive aircraft on its packed snow surface during periods of increased military posture, then the facility would be abandoned in the spring.  The facility appears to have been closed in the 1960s or 1970s as Russia's deterrence force shifted from bombers to ICBMs.

See also
 Chekurovka, abandoned Arctic staging base
 Aspidnoye (air base), abandoned Arctic staging base
 Tiksi North, abandoned Arctic staging base
 Tiksi West, abandoned Arctic staging base

References

Soviet Long Range Aviation Arctic staging bases
Populated places of Arctic Russia
Former populated places in Russia
Airports in Krasnoyarsk Krai